Scott Hammond (born 1966 in Syracuse, New York) is an American politician. He was elected to the Nevada State Senate in 2012 to represent District 18, which encompasses the northwest part of the Las Vegas Valley including portions of the communities of Summerlin, Centennial Hills, Tule Springs and Lone Mountain.  He defeated Kelli Ross, wife of Las Vegas City Councilman Steve Ross, by 1471 votes.

In 2017, Scott Hammond announced his candidacy for U.S. Congress in Nevada's 3rd Congressional District.

Electoral history

References

External links
 Congressional campaign website

1966 births
People from the Las Vegas Valley
University of Nevada, Las Vegas alumni
Living people
Republican Party members of the Nevada Assembly
Republican Party Nevada state senators
21st-century American politicians